Vedam may refer to:

 Singular form of Vedas in some South Indian languages
 Vedam Jaishankar, cricket correspondent
 Vedam Venkataraya Sastry (1853–1929), Sanskrit and Telugu poet, critic and dramatist
 Vedam (film), a 2010 Telugu film

Indian surnames